Danny Benstock (born 10 July 1970 in Hackney, London, England), is an English footballer who played as a midfielder. He played in the Football League for Leyton Orient.

References

External links

1970 births
Living people
English footballers
People from the London Borough of Hackney
Leyton Orient F.C. players
Barking F.C. players
Enfield F.C. players
Thurrock F.C. players
Bishop's Stortford F.C. players
Redbridge F.C. players
Romford F.C. players
English Football League players
National League (English football) players
Association football midfielders